Nawaz Khan Naji is a Pakistani politician who is member-elect of the Gilgit Baltistan Assembly. First nationalist leader to be part of GB assembly consecutively, three times (2012–16, 2016–20, 2020–24).
He was born in a village, Sherqilla, in District Ghizer. He graduated in political science from Karachi University Sindh. He came back to GB and founded his own nationalist political party, Balawaristan National Front, on 28 December 1989.
Naji is famous among educated youth especially studying in Down areas of Pakistan.

Political career
Although, he claims that he is the head of Balawaristan National Front (Naji), he contested 2020 Gilgit-Baltistan Assembly election on 15 November 2020 from constituency GBA-19 (Ghizer-I) as an Independent candidate. He won the election by the margin of 1,241 votes over the runner up Syed Jalal Ali Shah of Pakistan Peoples Party. He garnered 6,208 votes while Shah received 4,967 votes.

References

Living people
Gilgit-Baltistan MLAs 2020–2025
Politicians from Gilgit-Baltistan
Year of birth missing (living people)
People from Ghizer District